The King Frederick IX bridge (named for King Frederick IX of Denmark) is a combined road and railway bridge carrying the Danish national road 9 as well as Sydbanen and Lollandsbanen railway lines across the Guldborgsund strait between the islands of Falster and Lolland in Denmark. It joins the larger part of the city of Nykøbing on Falster with the smaller part of the town on Lolland. The rail link is a part of the railway section of the Fugleflugtslinjen transport corridor between Copenhagen, Denmark and Hamburg, Germany.

It is a bascule bridge of beam design. The bridge carries four lanes of vehicle traffic and a single railway track.

History 
In 1867, after many years of discussion, a pontoon bridge, the Christian IX Bridge, was constructed across the Guldborgsund from Nykøbing to Lolland, which at its inauguration was the longest in Denmark. Furthermore, in 1875 a separate railway bridge was constructed to allow for the railway lines on Lolland to reach Nykøbing. Both bridges were swing bridges which could be opened for passing ships. These two bridges existed – with several reconstructions – until 1963.

The current Frederick IX Bridge was constructed between 1960 and 1962. The official opening was on 14 May 1963.

Future developments 
There is a decision to widen the bridge with one more rail track and to fit electric overhead line, in connection with the Fehmarn Belt Tunnel. In order to cut cost for this, there is a wish from the tunnel company to not allow bridge openings after this.

Features 

The bridge has a central 20m span with two bascules, both on the eastern side of the bridge. One carries four lanes of vehicle traffic while the other carries a rail link. The two parts normally operate together. The bridge is manned during the day and opened on request for passing ships, but may only be opened once every half-hour. It is planned for the bridge to be re-equipped for automatic operation.

The bascules consist of a long bridge span and a short counterweight section. Each bascule is supported by two pivot bearings, one either side. Two motors, one either side of the bridge, turn shafts passing through the centre of the pivot bearings. Further shafts take power to the rear of the counterweights, where there are pinions pressing against a rack mounted in the wall of the counterweight chamber, which drive the bascule.

See also
 Danish national road 9
 Lollandsbanen
 Sydbanen
 Fehmarn Belt Fixed Link

References

External links
Bridge data
 
History of the bridge (in danish)

Bibliography 
 

Bridges in Denmark
Beam bridges in Denmark
Bascule bridges
Road bridges in Denmark
Railway bridges in Denmark
Bridges completed in 1962
1962 establishments in Denmark